Mr. & Mrs. Incredible is a 2011 Hong Kong-Chinese action comedy film directed by Vincent Kok and starring Louis Koo and Sandra Ng as the titular protagonists.

Cast
Louis Koo as Gazer Warrior
Sandra Ng as Aroma Woman
Wen Zhang as Zhuen Huang /King Kong / Emperor
Wang Po-chieh as Grandmaster Blanc
Li Qin as Blue Phoenix
Zhou Bo as He
Chapman To as Drunk
Li Jing as Real estate agent / Doctor
He Yunwei as  Evil Ant
Wang Wenbo
Da Zhangwei
Liang Long as Martial arts grandmaster
Yao Lan as Martial arts grandmaster
Li Ziqiang as Martial arts grandmaster
Sun Quan as Martial arts grandmaster
Wu Zekun as Martial arts grandmaster
Huang Xiaolan as No. 7
Steven Fung as Soldier
Vincent Kok as Soldier
Zhang Aiqin(Chinese Egghead)

Release
To promote the film and tourism and Hong Kong, a 3D animated film showing the two lead actors from the film was released.
Mr. & Mrs. Incredible was set to open in Australia, China, Hong Kong, Malaysia, New Zealand and Singapore on 2 February 2011. It was released on 3 February 2011 in China and Hong Kong.

FUNimation Entertainment released the film in the United States in autumn (September/October) of 2012 on DVD under the name Incredibly Ever After.

Mr. & Mrs. Incredible grossed $630,199 on its opening week in Hong Kong and placed fifth in its weekend box office and has since grossed a total of $1,032,487.

Reception
Film Business Asia gave the film a five out of ten rating, stating "the comedy is not sustained enough, or broad enough, to inspire real laughs rather than just smiles, and the action is largely crammed into the final 15 minutes with the sudden appearance of a plot and a super-villain." Variety gave the film a positive review, praising the script and comparing the two leads to William Powell and Myrna Loy.
The Special Broadcasting Service gave the film three stars out of five, finding that the film "delivers the crowd-pleasing goods in its own eccentric way." but lacked comic subtlety. The review also compared the film to The Incredibles stating that the "greatest superhuman feat is avoiding a court date with the suits at Pixar – the shameless similarities to The Incredibles (2004) are there for all to see."

Notes

External links
 
 Official website at FUNimation

2011 films
Chinese superhero films
2011 action comedy films
2010s superhero films
Hong Kong action comedy films
2010s martial arts comedy films
Hong Kong superhero films
Chinese action comedy films
Chinese martial arts comedy films
Hong Kong slapstick comedy films
2010s superhero comedy films
Hong Kong martial arts comedy films
Martial arts tournament films
Wuxia films
2010s Cantonese-language films
Funimation
Films directed by Vincent Kok
2011 martial arts films
2011 comedy films
2010s Hong Kong films